The 1979 Jordanian  League (known as The Jordanian  League,   was the 29th season of Jordan  League since its inception in 1944. Al-Ahli won its 8th title.

Teams

Map

League table 

 No them relegated because the Football Association decided to increase the number of clubs to 10 teams in the 1980 season.

Overview
Al-Ahli won the championship.

References
RSSSF

External links
 Jordan Football Association website

Jordanian Pro League seasons
Jordan
Jordan
football